Błaszków  is a village in the administrative district of Gmina Stąporków, within Końskie County, Świętokrzyskie Voivodeship, in south-central Poland.

The village has a population of 400.

Notable Descendants
Alexandria, Virginia Attorney Joseph A. Blaszkow's family is from this city, after which the family took its name.  Mr. Blaszkow was the first attorney in Virginia to receive an award of punitive damages in a DUI lawsuit. See Potomac News (Va.), 5/20/89

References

Villages in Końskie County